Ryan Jensen may refer to:

Ryan Jensen (fighter) (born 1977), mixed martial artist
Ryan Jensen (baseball) (born 1975), baseball player
Ryan Jensen (baseball, born 1997)
Ryan Jensen (American football) (born 1991), football player